The Aces are a long-standing rock and roll band from Hull, East Riding of Yorkshire, who have been playing for well over fifty years. At the height of their success in the 1960s they supported both The Beatles and The Rolling Stones, as well as releasing singles in the UK and U.S.

Early work
The Aces began playing in Hull during the British skiffle boom of the late 1950s. The line-up changed a few times, but stabilised with a quartet comprising Eric Lee (vocals), brothers Brian Gatie (guitar) and Adrian Gatie (drums), and Johnny Pat on bass. They were signed to Parlophone during the beat boom era.

The 1960s
They released two UK singles with Parlophone: "Wait Till Tomorrow" in December 1963 (with the B-side being "The Last One") and "I Count The Tears", a cover of The Drifters hit, in February 1964 (the B-side being "But Say It Isn't So"). In the United States "I Count The Tears" was released as "Counting Tears" on the Stellar label in August 1964. They toured the United Kingdom and played as a support act for both The Beatles and The Rolling Stones. Bassist and unofficial frontman Johnny Pat also played with another Hull band, The Small Four, who were signed to Pye Records and supported Jimi Hendrix.

Later work and charity fundraising
The Aces continue to perform regularly and have now been in showbusiness for well over fifty years. They frequently perform as part of charity fundraising events, and have been described as "a rock and roll band with a huge and enthusiastic following". In the Queen's 2017 Birthday Honours Johnny Pat was awarded the British Empire Medal (BEM) for services to charity fundraising and the community in Hull and East Riding of Yorkshire.

Singles

United Kingdom
 "Wait Till Tomorrow" (Parlophone) December 1963 (B-side: "The Last One")
 "I Count The Tears" (Parlophone) February 1964 (B-side: But Say It Isn't So")

United States
 "Counting Tears" (Stellar) August 1964 (B-side: "But Say It Isn't So")

References

English pop music groups
English rock music groups
British rock and roll music groups
British Invasion artists
Beat groups
Musical quartets
Musical groups established in 1959
Musical groups from Kingston upon Hull
Parlophone artists
1959 establishments in England